Robert Stone (born 5 January 1965) is an Australian former sprinter who competed in the 1988 Summer Olympics.

References

1965 births
Living people
People educated at Haileybury (Melbourne)
Australian male sprinters
Olympic athletes of Australia
Athletes (track and field) at the 1986 Commonwealth Games
Athletes (track and field) at the 1988 Summer Olympics
Athletes (track and field) at the 1990 Commonwealth Games
Commonwealth Games competitors for Australia